Joucas (Jocaç in Occitan) is a commune in the Vaucluse department in the Provence-Alpes-Côte d'Azur region in southeastern France. The town is located on the perimeter of the Parc naturel régional du Luberon.

Geography
Located between two of the "most beautiful villages in France," Gordes and Roussillon, Joucas is a small hilltop village of Monts de Vaucluse. From the village one can see the surrounding plain and ochre hills of Roussillon. Like other hilltop villages in the region, the village location was selected in part due to the good views, which allowed inhabitants to see enemies approaching from far away.

Population

Tourism
Like all municipalities in the Luberon, tourism plays a role, directly or indirectly, in the local economy. There are several main types of tourism in the Luberon. Historical and cultural tourism relies on the rich heritage of the hilltop villages. Vacation tourism has resulted in the significant development of cottages, hotels and rentals, a large concentration of pools, and activities such as the Provençal markets. Finally, green tourism benefits from the many hiking trails and protected lands in the Luberon and surroundings. Tourism (hotels, guest houses and restaurants, including a starred Michelin) is an important part of the Joucas economy.

Places to see

See also
Communes of the Vaucluse department
Luberon

References

Communes of Vaucluse